Robat-e Posht-e Badam (also Romanized as Robāţ-e Posht-e Bādām and Robāt-e-Posht Bādām; also known as Posht-e Bādām, Posht-e Bādom, Pusht-i-Bādām, Ribāt-i-Pusht-i-Bādām, and Robāţ-e Khalaf - e Bādām) is a village in Rabatat Rural District of Kharanaq District of Ardakan County, Yazd province, Iran. At the 2006 National Census, its population was 761 in 206 households. The following census in 2011 counted 686 people in 226 households. The latest census in 2016 showed a population of 770 people in 263 households; it was the largest village in its rural district.

References 

Ardakan County

Populated places in Yazd Province

Populated places in Ardakan County